The Brooklyn Training School for Teachers was a school in Brooklyn, New York dedicated to teacher education. It was founded in 1885, originally on the site of what is now Public School (P.S.) 4, and later expanded to include the current location of P.S. 69. When it was founded, it was the first municipal school dedicated to training teachers in the state of New York. In 1904, the educator Emma L. Johnston became its principal. In 1907, it was reopened as a dedicated teacher training school, with an accompanying model school. The new building was designed by C. B. J. Snyder, was constructed from 1902 to 1907 at 760 Prospect Place, and is now Brooklyn's P.S. 138. It was permanently closed down by the New York City government in 1933.

 Notable alumni
 Belle Adair (1889–1926) – silent film actress

References

1885 establishments in New York (state)
1933 disestablishments in New York (state)
Educational institutions established in 1885
Defunct schools in New York City
Educational institutions disestablished in 1933
Schools in Brooklyn